Dermestes carnivorus is a species of carpet beetle in the family Dermestidae. It is found in North America and Europe.

References

Further reading

External links

 

Dermestes
Articles created by Qbugbot
Beetles described in 1775
Taxa named by Johan Christian Fabricius